Everett Briggs may refer to:

Everett Ellis Briggs (born 1934), American diplomat
Everett Francis Briggs (1908–2006), American miners' activist